Booneacris is a genus of spur-throated grasshoppers in the family Acrididae. There are at least four described species in Booneacris.

Species
These four species belong to the genus Booneacris:
 Booneacris alticola Rehn & Randell, 1962 i c g b (Marys peak wingless grasshopper)
 Booneacris glacialis (Scudder, 1863) i c g b (wingless mountain grasshopper)
 Booneacris polita (Scudder, 1898) i c g b (Willamette wingless grasshopper)
 Booneacris variegata (Scudder, 1897) i c g
Data sources: i = ITIS, c = Catalogue of Life, g = GBIF, b = Bugguide.net

References

Further reading

 
 

Melanoplinae
Articles created by Qbugbot